is a lighthouse located on the outermost extremity of Cape Tappi, the northernmost point of Tsugaru Peninsula, Honshu, in Sotogahama, Aomori Prefecture, Japan. It is located within the Tsugaru Quasi-National Park and on clear days, Hokkaido can be seen across the Tsugaru Strait.

History
Construction of Tappizaki Lighthouse was completed on July 1, 1932. A radio beacon was installed in March 1933. The light came under the control of the Japan Coast Guard beginning in 1965. In 1998, the lamp was upgraded to a metal halide lamp. It was opened to the public on October 31, 2005. Since April 1, 2006, control of the light has been completely automated and it is currently unattended. It is listed as one of the “50 Lighthouses of Japan” by the Japan Lighthouse Association.

See also

 List of lighthouses in Japan

References

External links

Lighthouses in Japan 

Lighthouses completed in 1932
Buildings and structures in Aomori Prefecture
Lighthouses in Japan
Sotogahama, Aomori